The Poet and the Parrot is the second full-length album by Swedish heavy metal band Bombus. It was released on 26 August 2013 by Century Media Records and is available on download, CD and vinyl format.

Track listing

Personnel
 Feffe – Guitars, vocals
 Matte – Guitars, vocals
 Peter –	Drums
 Jonas – Bass

References

2013 albums
Bombus (band) albums
Century Media Records albums